The Page from the Dalmasse Hotel (German:Der Page vom Dalmasse-Hotel) may refer to

 The Page from the Dalmasse Hotel (novel), a novel by Maria von Peteani
 The Page from the Dalmasse Hotel (1933 film), a German film directed by Victor Janson 
 The Page from the Dalmasse Hotel (1958 film), an Austrian film directed by Thomas Engel. German title: